Loughrea Hurling is a Gaelic Athletic Association club located in the town of Loughrea, County Galway, Ireland. The club was founded in 1884 by Dillon Mannion and is almost exclusively concerned with the game of hurling. Pat O Connor and Mike Kelly were in charge of the 2006 Galway Senior Hurling Championship were the team reached The All Ireland Club Final were they were defeated by Kilkenny’s Ballyhale Shamrocks ending a great campaign.

Achievements
 Galway Senior Hurling Championship (2): 1941, 2006
 Connacht Senior Club Hurling Championship (1) 2006-07
 Galway Minor Hurling Championship (6) 1942, 1950, 1953, 1971, 1979, 2009

Notable players
Johnny Coen
Jamie Ryan
Paul Hoban
Soham burkul
Tiernan Killeen

References

External links
Loughrea Hurling Club

Gaelic games clubs in County Galway
Hurling clubs in County Galway